Pupina coxeni is a species of land snail with an operculum, a terrestrial gastropod mollusk in the family Pupinidae. This species is endemic to Australia.

References 

 OBIS info

Gastropods of Australia
Pupina
Taxonomy articles created by Polbot